Asaphocrita plummerella is a moth in the family Blastobasidae. It is found in the United States, including Maryland, Tennessee and Maine.

References

Moths described in 1910
plummerella